Priit Aimla (born 19 April 1941 in Võru) is an Estonian writer, poet, humorist and politician known for several stage plays and books. During 1992 to 1995, he belonged to the VII Riigikogu, having been elected as a member of the Independent Royalist Party of Estonia; later, he switched to Reformierakond.

In October 1980, Aimla was a signatory of the Letter of 40 Intellectuals, a public letter in which forty prominent Estonian intellectuals defended the Estonian language and protested the Russification policies of the Kremlin in Estonia.  The signatories also expressed their unease against Republic-level government in harshly dealing with youth protests in Tallinn that were sparked a week earlier due to the banning of a public performance of the punk rock band Propeller.

Awards 
In 1990, Priit Aimla was awarded the Meie Mats.

References

External links
 Priit Aimla at Estonian Writers' Online Dictionary

1941 births
Living people
People from Võru
Estonian Reform Party politicians
Members of the Riigikogu, 1992–1995
Members of the Riigikogu, 1995–1999
Estonian comedians
Estonian humorists
Estonian dramatists and playwrights
Estonian screenwriters
University of Tartu alumni
Recipients of the Order of the National Coat of Arms, 4th Class
Recipients of Meie Mats